The 1908 Western State Normal Hilltoppers football team represented Western State Normal School (later renamed Western Michigan University) as an independent during the 1908 college football season.  In their second season under head coach William H. Spaulding, the Hilltoppers compiled a 3–3 record and were outscored by their opponents, 98 to 33. Halfback Tubby Meyers was the team captain for the third consecutive year.

Schedule

References

Western State Normal
Western Michigan Broncos football seasons
Western State Normal Hilltoppers football